Thiesi is a town and comune located in the northern province of Sassari, in Sardinia, Italy. It has a population of 3,165.

References